Kilian Keller (born March 15, 1993) is a German professional ice hockey defenceman. He is currently playing for the Ravensburg Towerstars of the DEL2. He joined the Towerstars after previously playing with EHC Wolfsburg in the Deutsche Eishockey Liga (DEL).

References

External links 
 
 

1993 births
Living people
German ice hockey defencemen
Ravensburg Towerstars players
Grizzlys Wolfsburg players
Sportspeople from Füssen